Revúca District (okres Revúca) is a district in
the Banská Bystrica Region of central Slovakia. District had been established in 1996. Forests make 60% of the district area. Revúca District consist of 42 municipalities, from which three have a town status. In the district is 1 national park Muránska planina. The highest concentration of industry is in the zone Revúca-Lubeník-Jelšava, otherwise trade and agriculture dominates the district economy. Seat of the district is town Revúca. Overall, economy development of the district is under Slovakia's average.

Municipalities
Držkovce
Gemer
Gemerská Ves
Gemerské Teplice
Gemerský Sad
Hrlica
Hucín
Chvalová
Chyžné
Jelšava
Kameňany
Leváre
Levkuška
Licince
Lubeník
Magnezitovce
Mokrá Lúka
Muráň
Muránska Dlhá Lúka
Muránska Huta
Muránska Lehota
Muránska Zdychava
Nandraž
Otročok
Ploské
Polina
Prihradzany
Rákoš
Rašice
Ratková
Ratkovské Bystré
Revúca
Revúcka Lehota
Rybník
Sása
Sirk
Skerešovo
Šivetice
Tornaľa
Turčok
Višňové
Žiar

References

 
Districts of Slovakia